Catharine Gouger Waugh McCulloch (June 4, 1862 – April 20, 1945) was an American lawyer, suffragist, and reformer. She actively lobbied for women's suffrage at the local, state, and national levels as a leader in the Illinois Equal Suffrage Association, Chicago Political Equality League, and National American Woman Suffrage Association. She was the first woman elected Justice of the Peace in Illinois.

Early life and education
Catharine Waugh was born in New York to Susan Gouger and Abraham Miller Waugh. She was of French and Irish ancestry. Raised in Illinois, she graduated from Rockford Female Seminary in 1882, where she wrote a thesis on women's wages and earned both a B.A. and M.A. degree. Waugh then attended Chicago's Union College of Law (now Northwestern Pritzker School of Law). After graduating and passing the bar in 1886, Waugh sought employment in Chicago but faced gender discrimination. She returned to Rockford, Illinois and started her own practice.

Marriage and family
In 1890, Catharine Waugh married her former law school classmate, Frank Hawthorn McCulloch. They moved to Chicago and merged practices to form the law firm of McCulloch and McCulloch. Catharine sought equality in her relationship as both a private and political arrangement. According to letters she sent to colleagues, she believed her marriage to McCulloch helped advance her career. She raised four children: Hugh Waugh, Hathorn Waugh, Catharine Waugh, and Frank Waugh.

Career

McCulloch was a member of the Equity Club, a correspondence network founded in 1887 to provide support, friendship, and advice among women lawyers across the country. In 1888, McCulloch unsuccessfully ran for state's attorney on the Prohibition party ticket.

McCulloch began serving as the legislative chair of the Illinois Equal Suffrage Association in 1890. After the Illinois Supreme Court upheld a law granting women the right to vote in school district elections in 1891, McCulloch worked on a bill that would ensure women's suffrage for local and presidential elections in the state of Illinois. McCulloch and her colleagues at the Illinois Equal Suffrage Association actively lobbied for the bill from 1893 to 1913, even organizing train and automobile tours to rally suffrage supporters across the state. McCulloch's public-oriented methods of mobilizing supporters through rallies and publications reflected the style of many clubwomen, settlement-house workers, and other Progressive Era activists who sought suffrage as a means to advance other reform efforts. Her approach contrasted with that of more conservative members of the Illinois Equal Suffrage Association like Grace Wilbur Trout, who preferred more quiet and diplomatic lobbying.

In 1894, McCulloch and fellow members of the Chicago Woman's Club founded the Chicago Political Equity League to campaign for municipal suffrage. In addition to her suffrage work, McCulloch advocated for maternalist reform measures. For example, she championed the passage of a law in 1901 that gave women equal guardianship with their husbands over their children. In 1905, she helped raise the age of consent for girls from 14 to 16 years.

McCulloch was elected Justice of the Peace in Evanston, Illinois in 1907 (and re-elected in 1909), making her the first woman elected to that office in Illinois. While a Justice of the Peace, she made national headlines by agreeing to conduct egalitarian marriage ceremonies in which she omitted the word "obey" from the ritualized words the woman was supposed to say; at that time, the man pledged to "love, honor and cherish" while the woman pledged to "love, honor and obey."

In 1917, she was appointed as a master in chancery of the Cook County Superior Court. She became known for her advocacy in working to eliminate or modify marriage and divorce laws that discriminated against women, and she worked to create uniformity of such laws in all states.

She was the legal adviser for the National American Woman Suffrage Association (which became the League of Women Voters in 1920 after passage of the 19th Amendment) and was its first vice president. She also served as the legal adviser for the National Women's Christian Temperance Union.

McCulloch died of cancer in 1945 at the age of 82. Catharine W. McCulloch Park in Evanston is named for her.

Publications
 Bittenbender, Ada M. "Women in Law," in Farmer, Lydia Hoyt. The national exposition souvenir: what America owes to women Buffalo: C. W. Moulton, 1893. Pages 390–408.
 Drysdale, William. "The Woman Lawyer," in Helps for ambitious girls New York: T. Y. Crowell & Co., c1900. Pages 180–208.
 "Law," in Training for the professions and allied occupations: facilities available to women in the United States. New York: Bureau of Vocational Information, 1924. Pages 427–450.
 McCulloch, Catharine Waugh. "Women as Law Clerks" manuscript. c1887. (12 pages).
 Bureau of Vocational Information (New York). Records, 1908–1932: A Finding Aid
 Mr. Lex, Or The Legal Status of Mother and Child. Chicago: Fleming H. Revell Company, 1899, 85 pp.

References

External links

 Harvard University Library Open Collections Program. Women Working, 1870–1930, Catharine Gouger Waugh McCulloch (1862-1945). A full-text searchable online database with complete access to publications written by Catharine McCulloch.
 Women's Legal History Biography Project, Robert Crown Library, Stanford Law School. McCulloch, Catharine Gouger Waugh. Biographical articles, collected papers and archival materials.
 Papers, 1877-1983. Schlesinger Library, Radcliffe Institute, Harvard University.

1862 births
1945 deaths
Illinois lawyers
American suffragists
Illinois state court judges
Rockford University alumni
Northwestern University Pritzker School of Law alumni
American women judges
American temperance activists
19th-century American women lawyers
19th-century American lawyers